Tex may refer to:

People and fictional characters
 Tex (nickname), a list of people and fictional characters with the nickname
 Joe Tex (1933–1982), stage name of American soul singer Joseph Arrington Jr.

Entertainment
 Tex, the Italian comic book series by Sergio Bonelli Editore
 Tex (novel) (1979), by S.E. Hinton
 Tex (film), a 1982 film based on S.E. Hinton's novel, starring Matt Dillon
 Tex, the robot mascot for the American audio company THX

Computing
TeX, a typesetting system created by Donald Knuth and released in 1978
.tex, a file extension for TeX and LaTeX
Text Executive Programming Language, introduced by Honeywell in 1979

Other uses
 TEX (explosive), an explosive chemical compound
Tex (unit), a unit of measure for the linear mass density of fibers
Nestlé Tex, a South African chocolate bar
IATA airport code for Telluride Regional Airport

See also
Big Tex, the icon of the annual State Fair of Texas
Textainer Group Holdings, whose shipping containers are labeled "tex"
Tekes (disambiguation)